Moggio (Valassinese ) is a comune (municipality) in the Province of Lecco in the Italian region Lombardy, located about  northeast of Milan and about  northeast of Lecco.

Moggio borders the following municipalities: Barzio, Cassina Valsassina, Morterone, Taleggio, Vedeseta.

Twin towns
Moggio is twinned with:

  Moggio Udinese, Italy

References

External links
 Official website

Cities and towns in Lombardy
Valsassina